Collessomyia is a genus of tephritid  or fruit flies in the family Tephritidae.

Species
Collessomyia setiger Hardy & Drew, 1996

References

Tephritinae
Tephritidae genera
Diptera of Australasia